Torre Nova Diagonal is a 22-story residential skyscraper in Barcelona, Catalonia, Spain. It was constructed from 2003 to 2007, and stands at a height of 86 meters.

See also 

 List of tallest buildings and structures in Barcelona

References 

Skyscrapers in Barcelona
Residential buildings completed in 2007
Residential skyscrapers in Spain